Paprika is a 1991 Italian film directed by Tinto Brass. The film is loosely based on John Cleland's novel Fanny Hill, first published in 1748.

It was remade as an explicit pornographic film by Joe D'Amato in 1995.

Plot
In 1958, on the verge of the Merlin Law that makes brothels illegal, Mimma (Debora Caprioglio), a young country girl, comes to town and decides to work as a prostitute in order to help her fiancé get the money to start their own business, and is given the name Paprika at Madame Collette's (Martine Brochard) house. Once her fiancé betrays her, Mimma gives up her original ambitions and decides to pursue a career as a prostitute. In the process, she loses any sense of self-confidence and self-respect, but eventually she finds redemption, wealth, and her one true love.

Cast
Debora Caprioglio as Paprika
Stéphane Ferrara as Rocco
Martine Brochard as Madame Collette
Stéphane Bonnet as Franco
Rossana Gavinel as Gina
Renzo Rinaldi as Count Bastiano
Nina Soldano as The journalist
Clara Algranti as Sciura Angelina
Luciana Cirenei as Donna Olimpia
John Steiner as Prince Ascanio
Valentine Demy as Beba
Luigi Laezza as Nino
Riccardo Garrone as Paprika's uncle
Paul Muller as Milvio
Domiziano Arcangeli as Gualtiero Rosasco

Production
In his autobiography, Tinto Brass revealed he began a sexual affair with actress Debora Caprioglio during filming.

See also
 Italian films of 1991

References

External links 
 
 Paprika at Variety Distribution

1991 films
Films about prostitution in Italy
Films based on British novels
Films directed by Tinto Brass
Italian erotic drama films
Films set in 1958
Films scored by Riz Ortolani
1990s erotic drama films
1990s Italian-language films
1990s Italian films